The Miss Earth Slovenia is an annual national pageant that selects Slovenia's representative to the Miss Earth pageant.

Titleholders
Color key

The winner of Miss Earth Slovenia represents her country at Miss Earth. On occasion, when the winner does not qualify (due to age) for either contest, a runner-up is sent.

References

External links
Official page
 

Beauty pageants in Slovenia
Recurring events established in 2007
Slovenian awards